Hanumapur is a village in Bhongir mandal, Yadadri Bhuvanagiri district of Telangana, India.

References

Villages in Nalgonda district